Eylem  is a common girl's Turkish given name, though it is also used for boys. In Turkish, "Eylem" means "action".

Given name
 Eylem Atmaca, a Turkish singer and vocalist of Ezginin Günlüğü
 Eylem Çeliker, a Turkish model and titleholder of Best Model of Turkey 1995
 Eylem Elif Maviş (born 1973), first Turkish woman mountaineer to climb Mount Everest
 Eylem Pelit, a Turkish bassist and drummer and one of the members of the group performing Dinle in Eurovision Song Contest 1997
 Eylem Şenkal, a Turkish model, TV star and volleyball player in Turkey

Turkish feminine given names